"Lakeside Park" is a single from Rush's third album Caress of Steel. The music was written by Geddy Lee and Alex Lifeson, and the lyrics were written by Neil Peart.

Background
The "Lakeside Park" mentioned in this song is on the shore of Port Dalhousie, a suburb of St. Catharines, Ontario, on the south shore of Lake Ontario in Canada. Peart lived very close to Lakeside Park, and spent summers as a youth working and playing there. The lyrics mention the "24th of May", which is Victoria Day, commemorating Queen Victoria's birthday.

The smaller of the two piers in Port Dalhousie has been used as a staging area for most of the Hamilton–Scourge survey expeditions to the wreck sites, since the early 1980s.

Neil Peart gave some insight regarding the song:

Geddy Lee gave a somewhat unfavorable mention of this song in a 1993 interview:

In June 2020, the city of St. Catharines announced that a pavilion in Lakeside Park would be named after Neil Peart.

Live performances
The song was played in part, for the first time since the mid-1970s, on the 2015 R40 tour. In a 2016 interview with Guitar World, Lee reaffirmed his distaste for the song, but agreed to include it in the setlist when Lifeson expressed interest.

Personnel
Geddy Lee - vocals, bass
Alex Lifeson - guitars
Neil Peart - drums

See also
List of Rush songs

References

1975 songs
Rush (band) songs
Songs about Canada
Songs about nostalgia
St. Catharines
Songs written by Neil Peart
Songs written by Geddy Lee
Songs written by Alex Lifeson
Song recordings produced by Terry Brown (record producer)